Wayne Stewart Martin  (born 28 December 1952) is a lawyer and former judge who served as Chief Justice of Western Australia from 2006 until 2018, and Lieutenant-Governor of Western Australia from 2009 to 2019.

Early life and education
Martin was born on 28 December 1952 and attended North Perth Primary School and Christ Church Grammar School. He graduated from the University of Western Australia in 1973, with a Bachelor of Laws and First Class Honours. Martin completed his articled clerkship with Lavan & Walsh, and subsequently completed a Master of Laws degree at King's College London. He was admitted to practice in Western Australia in 1977, and was a partner of the law firm Keall Brinsden (now Corrs Chambers Westgarth) until joining the independent bar in 1988.  He was made a QC in 1993.

Legal career
In addition to his work as a barrister, Martin is a former chairman of the Western Australian Law Reform Commission, president of the Administrative Review Council, and president of the Western Australia Bar Association.  In addition, he is a former president of the Law Society of Western Australia and a director of the Law Council of Australia.

Judicial career
As Chief Justice, Martin spoke out about the need to enhance access to justice and improve the efficiency of the legal system.  He also came to the defence of the legal system in the wake of criticisms in some sections of the media that resulted from several high-profile miscarriages of justice.

Martin instigated several changes to modernise the courts in Western Australia, including abolishing the traditional wigs and jabots, publishing sentencing comments online, and allowing the use of electronic devices and social media when covering court cases.

In his role as Lieutenant-Governor, he has served as Administrator of the State on two occasions when the position of Governor of Western Australia is vacant: from 2 May to 1 July 2011, following the expiration of Ken Michael's term, and from 1 July 2014 to October 2014, following the expiration of Malcolm McCusker's term.

Martin retired in July 2018.

Honours
On 11 June 2012, Chief Justice Martin was named an Companion of the Order of Australia for "eminent service to the judiciary and to the law, particularly as Chief Justice of the Supreme Court of Western Australia, to legal reform and education, and to the community".

See also
 Judiciary of Australia

References

External links
 Transcript of farewell ceremony at the Supreme Court, on Martin's retirement.

1952 births
Living people
Companions of the Order of Australia
Alumni of King's College London
Australian King's Counsel
Chief Justices of Western Australia
People educated at Christ Church Grammar School
People from Perth, Western Australia
University of Western Australia alumni
Judges of the Supreme Court of Western Australia
21st-century Australian judges
Fellows of King's College London